Hrast pri Jugorju is a settlement in the Municipality of Metlika in the White Carniola area of southeastern Slovenia. The whole of White Carniola is part of the traditional region of Lower Carniola and is now included in the Southeast Slovenia Statistical Region.

References

External links
Hrast pri Jugorju on Geopedia

Populated places in the Municipality of Metlika